Domínico Americano School is an English-speaking private school founded in 1981 in Santo Domingo, Dominican Republic. The school provides education to students from pre-kindergarten to 12th grade. The curriculum is similar to that of a US university-preparatory school. Domínico Americano School is accredited by the Southern Association of Colleges and Schools. The school is operated by the Instituto Cultural Dominico-Americano. 

Schools in Santo Domingo